Goniastrea stelligera, commonly known as knob coral, is a species of stony coral in the family Merulinidae. It occurs in shallow water on the coast of East Africa and in the Indo-Pacific region. This is a common species of coral but it seems to be decreasing in abundance. The main threat it faces is from the destruction of its coral reef habitat, and it is also moderately susceptible to coral bleaching, so the International Union for Conservation of Nature has rated its conservation status as being "near threatened".

References

Merulinidae
Corals described in 1846
Taxobox binomials not recognized by IUCN